The New Zealand Journal of Asian Studies is a peer-reviewed academic journal that was  founded in June 1999. It is the official journal of the New Zealand Asian Studies Society. The journal covers a broad range of Asia-related topics. It is published biannually, in June and in December. The journal contains a mixture of academic articles and reviews, from contributors both within and outside New Zealand.

The editor-in-chiefs are Paola Voci (University of Otago) and Sekhar Bandyopadhyay (Victoria University of Wellington)
).

External Links

References

Publications established in 1999
Asian studies journals
English-language journals
Biannual journals